Zofia Marchewka (died 1717 or in other source 1771), was a Polish alleged witch. Her case was a late case of a witch trial, particularly as it resulted in an execution, and one of the last in Poland. It also illustrates the use of torture in witch trials and the process of confessions by torture used.

She was accused by a townsman in Brześć Kujawski for having cast a spell upon his wife. Zofia Marchewka was arrested and put on trial. She denied the accusation. When interrogated during the use of torture, she confessed to the accusation and of being a witch, having participated in the black sabbath and consorted with the Devil. When the torture ended, she retracted her confession. When the torture was applied again, she confessed a second time. She was judged guilty as charged and sentenced to be executed by burning. The execution was performed in Brześć Kujawski.

References

18th-century Polish people
18th-century Polish women
People executed by burning
People executed for witchcraft
Polish torture victims
Witch trials in Poland